Pancalia hexachrysa is a moth of the family Cosmopterigidae. It was described by Edward Meyrick in 1935. It is found in Japan and Russia.

The wingspan is 12–14 mm.

References

Moths described in 1935
Antequerinae
Moths of Japan